Unio tumidiformis is a species of bivalve belonging to the family Unionidae.

The species is found in Pyrenees.

References

Unionidae